Nautalle Durbar (sometimes known as Basantapur Durbar) is a palace in Hanuman Dhoka, Kathmandu Durbar Square.

It was built by Prithvi Narayan Shah to commemorate the Unification of Nepal. During the April 2015 Nepal earthquake, the top tiers collapsed.

Nautalle Durbar also served as the early residence of the King of Nepal.

References 

Palaces in Kathmandu
Kathmandu Durbar Square
World Heritage Sites in Nepal
18th-century establishments in Nepal
Shah palaces of Nepal